Arius Didymus ( Areios Didymos; fl. 1st century BCE) was a Stoic philosopher and teacher of Augustus. Fragments of his handbooks summarizing Stoic and Peripatetic doctrines are preserved by Stobaeus and Eusebius.

Life
Arius was a citizen of Alexandria. Augustus esteemed him so highly, that after the conquest of Alexandria, he declared that he spared the city chiefly for the sake of Arius. According to Plutarch, Arius advised Augustus to execute Caesarion, the son of Cleopatra and Julius Caesar, with the words "ouk agathon polukaisarie" ("it is not good to have too many Caesars"), a pun on a line in Homer.

Arius as well as his two sons, Dionysius and Nicanor, are said to have instructed Augustus in philosophy. He is frequently mentioned by Themistius, who says that Augustus valued him not less than Agrippa. From Quintilian it appears that Arius also taught or wrote on rhetoric. He is presumably the "Arius" whose Life was among those in the missing final section of book VII of the Lives of Diogenes Laërtius.

Philosophy
Arius Didymus is usually identified with the Arius whose works are quoted at length by Stobaeus, summarising Stoic, Peripatetic and Platonist philosophy. That his full name is Arius Didymus we know from Eusebius, who quotes two long passages of his concerning Stoic views on God; the conflagration of the Universe; and the soul.

Notes

Further reading
 Fortenbaugh, W. (Editor) (2002). On Stoic and Peripatetic Ethics: The Work of Arius Didymus. Transaction Publishers. 
 
 Inwood, R. and L.P. Gerson, L.P. (1997). Hellenistic Philosophy. Introductory Readings, 2nd edition, Hackett Publishing Company, Indianapolis/Cambridge, pp. 203–232. 
 Pomeroy, Arthur J. (ed.) (1999). "Arius Didymus". Epitome of Stoic Ethics. Texts and Translations 44; Graeco-Roman 14.   Atlanta, GA:  Society of Biblical Literature.  pp. ix, 160.

External links
 Eusebius of Caesarea, Praeparatio Evangelica, Book XV. 15, 18–20.
 Joannes Stobaeus, Anthology, Book II. 7.5–12.

1st-century BC philosophers
Roman-era Stoic philosophers
Roman-era Alexandrians
Year of birth unknown
Year of death unknown